The Dogs D'Amour is self-titled EP release, by the rock band The Dogs D'Amour. It was released only in Japan and was put out in 1988, around the time of their "In The Dynamite Jet Saloon" album.

Track listing
 "The Kid from Kensington" (Extended Version)
 "Firework Girl"
 "How Come It Never Rains" (Original Recording, not on In The Dynamite Jet Saloon)
 "How Do You Fall In Love Again?"
 "Tales of Destruction"
 "Wait Till I'm Dead"

Band
Tyla - vocals
Jo "Dog" Almeida - guitars
Steve James - bass
Bam - drums

The Dogs D'Amour albums
1988 debut EPs